Preben Kollster Eriksen (born 9 August 1958) in Odense, Denmark, is a former speedway rider who rode with the Wolverhampton Wolves and the Ipswich Witches in the British League. He currently lives in England and has a grandson called Luke.

He won the World Team Cup with Denmark in 1984 and 1985.

World Final Appearances

Individual World Championship
 1981 -  London, Wembley Stadium - reserve - did not ride

World Team Cup
 1982 -  London, White City Stadium (with Ole Olsen / Hans Nielsen / Erik Gundersen / Tommy Knudsen) - 2nd - 27pts (4)
 1984 -  Leszno, Alfred Smoczyk Stadium (with Bo Petersen / Erik Gundersen / Hans Nielsen) - Winner - 44pts (9)
 1985 -  Long Beach, Veterans Memorial Stadium (with Bo Petersen / Tommy Knudsen / Erik Gundersen / Hans Nielsen) - Winner - 37pts (5)

See also
 Denmark national speedway team

References 

1958 births
Living people
Danish speedway riders
Belle Vue Aces riders
Wolverhampton Wolves riders
Ipswich Witches riders
Mildenhall Fen Tigers riders
Sportspeople from Odense